The 2022 GP Industria & Artigianato di Larciano was the 53rd edition of the GP Industria & Artigianato di Larciano road cycling one-day race that was held on 27 March 2022. It was held as a 1.Pro event on the 2022 UCI ProSeries.

Teams 
Four UCI WorldTeams, eight UCI ProTeams, eight UCI Continental teams and one national team made up the twenty-one teams that participated in the race. Each team could enter up to seven riders, though many teams entered fewer. Of the 122 riders in the race, there were only 54 finishers.

UCI WorldTeams

 
 
 
 

UCI ProTeams

 
 
 
 
 
 
 
 

UCI Continental Teams

 
 
 
 
 
 
 
 

National Teams

 Italy

Result

References 

GP Industria and Artigianato di Larciano
GP Industria and Artigianato di Larciano
GP Industria and Artigianato di Larciano
2022
March 2022 sports events in Italy